Elisabeth of Savoy (Maria Francesca Elisabetta Carlotta Giuseppina; 13 April 1800 – 25 December 1856) was the Vicereine of the Kingdom of Lombardy–Venetia by marriage to Archduke Rainer Joseph of Austria. She was the aunt and mother-in-law of Vittorio Emanuele II, the first king of a united Italy. By birth, she was a member of the House of Savoy-Carignano.

Early life

Maria Francesca Elisabetta Carlotta Giuseppina was born in Paris to Charles Emmanuel, Prince of Carignano (1770–1800), and Princess Maria Cristina of Saxony (1770–1851). She had an elder brother, Charles Albert, future King of Sardinia.

Marriage
On 28 May 1820 she was married in Prague to Archduke Rainer of Austria, Viceroy of the Kingdom of Lombardy–Venetia.

Death
Elisabeth died of tuberculosis in Bolzano on Christmas Day, 1856.

Issue
With Rainer she had eight children: 
 Maria Carolina (1821–1844)
 Adelaide (3 June 1822 – 20 January 1855), who became the wife of Vittorio Emanuele II, King of Sardinia from 1849 to 1861 and subsequently King of Italy.
 Leopoldo Luigi (6 June 1823 – 24 May 1898)
 Ernesto Carlo (8 August 1824 – 4 April 1899)
 Sigismondo Leopoldo (7 January 1826 – 15 December 1891)
 Ranieri Ferdinando (11 January 1827 – 27 January 1913)
 Enrico Antonio (9 May 1828 – 30 November 1891)
 Massimiliano Carlo (16 January 1830 – 16 March 1839)

Ancestry

References
The original version of this article was based principally on its equivalent in the Italian Wikipedia, in the version retrieved on 2007-03-12.

External links
 

1800 births
1856 deaths
Austrian princesses
House of Habsburg-Lorraine
House of Savoy-Carignano
Italian people of Polish descent
Italian nobility
Nobility from Paris
Princesses of Savoy